The Beretta 9000 is a series of modern compact size semi-automatic pistols designed and manufactured by Beretta of Italy. It is used primarily for civilian self-defense.

The Beretta 9000 pistol is a polymer-framed design that retains traditional open-top slide styling with modern materials. It is chambered for either the 9×19 mm or .40 S&W cartridges and can be fitted with either 10- or 12-round magazines, depending on the caliber. Adapters are available that allow the use of standard-capacity Beretta 92 series magazines. An adjustable finger rest can be either lowered for those with large hands or raised for those with small hands. The weapon has fixed sights.

Variants
There are four variants of the 9000S—two calibers and each caliber in one of two configuration types, e.g. the 9000S Type D in 9×19 mm is sometimes referred to as 9000S D9, whereas the .40 S&W in Type F configuration would be 9000 F40. The 9000 series is available in 9×19mm and .40 S&W calibers in either D or F configurations denoting traditional double-action and decocker models respectively.

References

Beretta firearms
9000